Malmeege Amila Aponso, or Amila Aponso (born 23 June 1993) is a professional Sri Lankan cricketer, who played for the Sri Lanka cricket team. He played first-class cricket for Ragama Cricket Club. He is a past pupil of St. Sebastians College, Moratuwa. In June 2021, Aponso moved to the United States to play in the Minor League Cricket tournament.

Domestic career
In April 2018, he was named in Dambulla's squad for the 2018 Super Provincial One Day Tournament. In August 2018, he was named in Dambulla's squad the 2018 SLC T20 League.

He was the leading wicket-taker for Ragama Cricket Club in the 2018–19 Premier League Tournament, with 47 dismissals in nine matches. In October 2020, he was drafted by the Colombo Kings for the inaugural edition of the Lanka Premier League.

International career
Aponso took 31 first-class wickets at an average of 20.9 in the 2015 season, and was rewarded with a place in the Sri Lanka A squad to New Zealand, later that year. After series of good performances in domestic arena in 2015 and 2016, he had to wait until Sri Lanka's main spinner Rangana Herath retired from limited-overs cricket.

In August 2016 he was added to Sri Lanka's squad for their One Day International (ODI) series against Australia. He made his ODI debut for Sri Lanka against Australia on 21 August 2016. He took his first international wicket by dismissing Aaron Finch. Sri Lanka lost the match by 3 wickets, but commentators praised the bowling performances of Aponso.

He was part of the Sri Lankan team that won the ACC Emerging Teams Asia Cup 2017 by defeating Pakistan in the final. He was the top wicket-taker for Sri Lanka in that tournament with 12 dismissals.

In February 2018, he was named in Sri Lanka's Twenty20 International (T20I) squad for their series against Bangladesh. He made his T20I debut for Sri Lanka against Bangladesh on 18 February 2018. He took his first T20I wicket by dismissing Tamim Iqbal.

In May 2018, he was one of 33 cricketers to be awarded a national contract by Sri Lanka Cricket ahead of the 2018–19 season. In November 2019, he was named in Sri Lanka's squad for the 2019 ACC Emerging Teams Asia Cup in Bangladesh.

References

External links
 

1993 births
Living people
Sri Lankan cricketers
Sri Lanka One Day International cricketers
Sri Lanka Twenty20 International cricketers
Ragama Cricket Club cricketers
Cricketers from Colombo
Galle Guardians cricketers
Mannar District cricketers
Alumni of St. Sebastian's College, Moratuwa
Colombo Stars cricketers